Ruse is a suburb of Sydney, in the state of New South Wales, Australia. It is 55 kilometres south-west of the Sydney central business district, in the local government area of the City of Campbelltown.

History
Ruse was named after James Ruse, known as Australia's first farmer. Prior to the 1960s, the area was part of Kentlyn and mostly farm and bushland. The area was then declared open for development and turned into a residential housing estate. It was at this time the name Ruse was proclaimed. Other names were suggested, such as Fisher and Marlow, however the mayor of the day overturned these.

Local infrastructure
The main street of Ruse is Junction Road, which contains the small Ruse Village Shopping Centre and Ruse Primary School. Both opened in the late 1970s and the school is notable for its hexagonal buildings. In between is Worrell Park which hosts rugby league matches including lower grade teams from the Western Suburbs Magpies.

People
According to the 2006 census, Ruse recorded a population of 5,625 in 1,986 properties. There were higher than average numbers of people who owned their homes outright (34%) or were paying them off (47%) while the number of renters (15%) was almost half the national average. The median family income of $1350 per week was higher than the national average as was the median housing loan repayment of $1408 per month.

References

Suburbs of Sydney
City of Campbelltown (New South Wales)